Crematogaster rothneyi, is a species of ant of the subfamily Myrmicinae.

Subspecies
Crematogaster rothneyi civa Forel, 1902 - India
Crematogaster rothneyi haputalensis Forel, 1913 - Sri Lanka
Crematogaster rothneyi rothneyi Mayr, 1879 - Cambodia, India, China

References

External links

 at antwiki.org
Animaldiversity.org
Itis.org

rothneyi
Hymenoptera of Asia
Insects described in 1879